, also known as , , or rice ball, is a Japanese food made from white rice formed into triangular or cylindrical shapes and often wrapped in nori. Traditionally, an onigiri is filled with pickled ume (umeboshi), salted salmon, katsuobushi, kombu, tarako, mentaiko, takanazuke (pickled takana, Japanese giant red mustard greens) or any other salty or sour ingredient as a natural preservative. Most Japanese convenience stores stock their onigiri with various fillings and flavors. There are even specialized shops which only sell onigiri to take out. Due to the popularity of this trend in Japan, onigiri has become a popular staple in Japanese restaurants worldwide.

Despite common misconceptions, onigiri is not a form of sushi and should not be confused with the type of sushi called nigirizushi or simply nigiri. Onigiri is made with plain rice (sometimes lightly salted), while sushi is made of rice with vinegar, sugar and salt. Onigiri makes rice portable and easy to eat as well as preserving it, while sushi originated as a way of preserving fish.

History

Before the use of chopsticks became widespread, in the Nara period, rice was often rolled into a small ball so that it could be easily picked up. In the Heian period, rice was made into small rectangular shapes known as tonjiki so that they could be piled onto a plate and easily eaten. At that time, onigiri were called tonjiki and often consumed at outdoor picnic lunches. In Murasaki Shikibu's 11th-century diary Murasaki Shikibu Nikki, she writes of people eating tonjiki rice balls. Other writings, dating back as far as the seventeenth century, state that many samurai stored rice balls wrapped in bamboo sheath as a quick lunchtime meal during war.

From the Kamakura period to the early Edo period, onigiri was used as a quick meal. This made sense as cooks simply had to think about making enough onigiri and did not have to concern themselves with serving. These onigiri were simply balls of rice flavored with salt. Nori did not become widely available until the Genroku era of the mid-Edo period, when the farming of nori and fashioning it into sheets became widespread.

Mass manufacturing
In the 1980s, a machine to make triangular onigiri was invented. Rather than rolling the filling inside, the flavoring was put into a hole in the onigiri and the hole was hidden by nori. Since the onigiri made by this machine came with nori already applied to the rice ball, over time the nori became moist and sticky, clinging to the rice.

A packaging improvement allowed the nori to be stored separately from the rice. Before eating, the diner could open the packet of nori and wrap the onigiri. The use of a hole for filling the onigiri made new flavors of onigiri easier to produce as this cooking process did not require changes from ingredient to ingredient. Modern mechanically wrapped onigiri are specially folded so that the plastic wrapping is between the nori and rice to act as a moisture barrier. When the packaging is pulled open at both ends, the nori and rice come into contact and are eaten together. This packaging is commonly found for both triangular onigiri and rolls (細巻き).

Rice
Usually, onigiri is made with boiled white rice, though it is sometimes made with different varieties of cooked rice, such as:
 O-kowa or kowa-meshi (sekihan): glutinous rice cooked or steamed with vegetables (red beans)
 Maze-gohan (lit. "mixed rice"): cooked rice mixed with preferred ingredients
 Fried rice

Fillings
Umeboshi, okaka, or tsukudani have long been frequently used as fillings for onigiri. Generally, onigiri made with pre-seasoned rice is not filled with ingredients. Plain (salt only) onigiri is called shio-musubi.

Typical fillings are listed below:
 Dressed dishes: tuna with mayonnaise (シーチキン), shrimp with mayonnaise, negitoro (ネギトロ), etc.
 Dried fish: roasted and crumbled mackerel (鯖), Japanese horse mackerel (鰺), etc.
 Kakuni: dongpo pork
 Dried food: okaka, etc.
 Processed roe: mentaiko (明太子), tarako (たらこ), tobiko (とびこ), etc.
 Shiokara: squid, shuto, etc.
 Tsukudani: nori, Hypoptychus dybowskii (小女子), Venerupis philippinarum (浅蜊), etc.
 Pickled fruit and vegetables: umeboshi, takana, nozawana, etc.

Local variants
 Miso-onigiri: mainly in eastern Japan. Miso as fillings sometimes mixed with green onion, or spread over and roasted as a variant of Yaki-onigiri.
 Tenmusu: originally in Tsu, Mie. became famous as Nagoya cuisine.
 Pork-tamago-onigiri: in Okinawa. Lunch meat and fried egg as fillings.

See also  

 Arancinian Italian dish of fried, breadcrumb-coated rice balls, with various fillings
 CifantuanShanghainese rice balls, commonly eaten for breakfast
 Jumeokbapa Korean dish of Japanese onigiri-styled rice balls, with various fillings
 Zongzia Chinese glutinous rice dish served with various fillings wrapped in bamboo or reed leaves

Notes

References

External links
 

Glutinous rice dishes
Japanese rice dishes